Vroom Vroom may refer to:

 Vroom Vroom (TV series), a British TV series
 Vroom Vroom (EP), an EP by Charli XCX
 Vrooom Vrooom, an EP by King Crimson
 "Vroom Vroom", a single from the 2016 album Evolution Pop Vol. 1 by South Korean girl group Crayon Pop
 "Vroom Vroom", a song from the soundtrack of the 2015 Indian film 10 Endrathukulla
 "Vroom Vroom", a song by Exo-CBX from the 2018 EP Blooming Days
 "Vroum Vroum", a song by Moha K. See list 
 "Vroom, Vroom", an episode from Bali, a French-Canadian animated TV series

See also
 Vroom (disambiguation)
 Vroom Vroom Vroooom, an American short film released in 1995